Leporello may refer to:
Don Giovanni's servant in Mozart's opera
A type of binding for a folded leaflet